Joachim Gérard and Stefan Olsson defeated the defending champion Stéphane Houdet and his partner Ben Weekes in the final, 6–3, 6–2 to win the men's doubles wheelchair tennis title at the 2019 Australian Open.

Houdet and Nicolas Peifer were the reigning champions, but Peifer did not participate.

Seeds

Draw

Draw

References 

General

 Drawsheets on ausopen.com

Specific

Wheelchair Men's Doubles
2019 Men's Doubles